Purple Naked Ladies is the debut studio album by American soul band The Internet, a duo consisting of Syd tha Kyd and Matt Martians of Odd Future at the time. The digital version of the album was released on December 20, 2011, with a physical copy, with bonus tracks released on January 31, 2012. The album is the first physically released album on Odd Future's own record label Odd Future Records.

Personnel

The Internet is formed of Odd Future members Syd the Kyd, the group's sound engineer, audio mixer, and live DJ, and Matt Martians, one half of The Jet Age of Tomorrow. The album features collaborations with fellow Odd Future members Left Brain, Mike G, and Pyramid Vritra as well as other guest artists Tay Walker, Kilo Kish, and Coco O.

Singles
The album's first single, "Love Song -1" was released on September 14, 2011. The second single, "They Say", which features Tay Walker, was released on October 4, 2011, though before its single release, it was included on the Odd Future compilation album 12 Odd Future Songs. The third single, "Cocaine", which features Left Brain, had its music video premiere on Odd Future's YouTube page on October 31, 2011. It was released as a single to the iTunes Store on November 8, 2011, as a 3 track EP including "Love Song -1" and "They Say" as tracks 2 and 3 respectively. The fourth single, "Fastlane", was released on January 19, 2012.

Release
The album's cover artwork was released on November 8, 2011. A bonus EP was later released for free on the official Odd Future website. It was intended to be packaged with the album, but due to a manufacturing issue, it was left out.

Reception

The album received mixed reviews, scoring an average of 55 out of 100 on Metacritic based on 21 reviews. The album peaked at number 31 on the US Billboard Heatseekers Albums charts on January 7, 2012.

Track listing
The track listing was reported by Pretty Much Amazing on November 8, 2011.

 "They Say" written by Sydney Bennett and Tay Walker; produced by The Internet. "Shangrila" written by Sydney Bennett; produced by Frisco.
 "Cocaine" written by Sydney Bennett, Matthew Martin, Anthony Negrete and Vyron Turner; produced by The Internet. "Tevie" written by Vyron Turner, Sydney Bennett and Matthew Martin; produced by Left Brain & The Internet.
 Frisco is Syd Tha Kyd.

References

External links
 oddfuture.com
 oddfuture.tumblr.com
 purplenakedladies.com

2011 debut albums
The Internet (band) albums
Odd Future Records albums
Albums produced by Left Brain
Albums produced by Frank Ocean
Albums produced by Tyler, the Creator